Novoselyane is a village in Bobov Dol Municipality, Kyustendil Province in south-western Bulgaria.

References

Villages in Kyustendil Province